Coneysthorpe is a small village and civil parish in the Ryedale district of North Yorkshire, England. The Centenary Way long-distance path runs through the village.

References

External links

Villages in North Yorkshire
Civil parishes in North Yorkshire